Tyrone station is an Amtrak railway station located approximately 15 miles northeast of Altoona, Pennsylvania on Pennsylvania Avenue south of West 10th Street in Tyrone, Pennsylvania. The station is located in the south end of the borough, and is currently only served by Amtrak's Pennsylvanian, which operates once per day in each direction.

A new railroad station building exists at the stop, but it is only currently used as a museum for the Tyrone Historical Society. There is no ticket office at this station. Due to the small number of passengers, Tyrone station is a flag stop.

Historically, there had been more Pennsylvania Railroad trains between Pittsburgh and Harrisburg, with many stopping at the station. Tyrone had been the departure point for trains on the 'Bald Eagle Valley Branch' to Lock Haven for Altoona - Williamsport trains via Tyrone and Lock Haven. The last Altoona–Lock Haven train was between August 1950 and 1951.

References

External links 

Tyrone Amtrak Station (USA RailGuide -- TrainWeb)

Amtrak stations in Pennsylvania
Stations on the Pittsburgh Line
Railway stations in Blair County, Pennsylvania
Former Pennsylvania Railroad stations